Enrico Alvino (1809–1872) was an Italian architect and urban designer, particularly active in Naples in the mid-19th century. He was born in Milan, and died in Rome.

Works
Among his important works in Naples are:

façade of the church of Santa Maria di Piedigrotta (1853);
laid out (with others) the street, Corso Maria Teresa, today named Corso Vittorio Emanuele (between 1852 and 1860), finished in 1870;
planned the restoration of the façade of the Cathedral of Naples, completed in 1870;
redesigned the Santa Lucia quarter in 1862;
redesigned (with others) the Villa Comunale;
converted the ancient convent of San Giovanni a Costantinopoli into the Royal Academy of Fine Arts;

In Catania, he helped complete the Palazzo Paternò del Toscano in Piazza Stesicoro.

Sources
  Emilio Lavagnino, ALVINO, Enrico in Dizionario Biografico degli Italiani, II volume, Rome, Istituto dell'Enciclopedia Italiana, 1960.

1808 births
1872 deaths
19th-century Italian architects
Italian urban planners
Urban designers
Architects from Naples